"What is Love" is a song recorded by American recording artist V. Bozeman for 1st studio album of the TV series Empire. The song was written by Daniel Jones, Timbaland, Jim Beanz, while Timbaland, Jim Beanz also handled the production.

Composition

Critical reception
The song received positive reviews from critics. Billboard praised "What is Love" as a "captivating performance", it said "As fans will recall, Bozeman put an exclamation point on the first season of Empire...". New York Post said, "In the hip-hop-heavy soundtrack, the impressive tones of V. Bozeman make for a soulful moment. The song is brief and melancholy, but it’s long enough for the Los Angeles-born vocalist to turn heads and establish herself as a rising star.

Music video
The music video was released on January 14, 2015.

Track listing
 "What is Love" - Single

Chart performance
"What is Love" has not entered the Billboard Hot 100 but has charted at number 12 on the Bubbling Under Hot 100 Singles, the song has entered at number 39 in the US R&B songs, and at number 13 in the US Hot R&B/Hip-Hop Songs. It has also entered at number 67 in France.

Release history

References

External links

2015 singles
2015 songs
Mosley Music Group singles
Songs written by Timbaland
Songs written by Jim Beanz
Songs from television series